The Halifax Drive Historic District was a U.S. historic district (designated as such on February 5, 1998) located in Port Orange, Florida. The district ran roughly along Halifax Drive from Dunlawton to Herbert Street. It contained 17 historic buildings.

On January 29, 2009, it was removed from the National Register.

Gallery

References

External links
 Volusia County listings at National Register of Historic Places

Historic districts in Florida
Former National Register of Historic Places in Florida
Port Orange, Florida
1998 establishments in Florida
2009 disestablishments in Florida